Another Wild Idea is a 1934 American Pre-Code short comedy science fiction film directed by and starring Charley Chase. It focuses on a Ray Gun which releases all of a persons inhibitions.

Cast
 Charley Chase as Charley
 Betty Mack as Betty
 Frank Austin as Betty's Father
 Harry Dunkinson as Judge
 James C. Morton as Milkman
 Harry Bernard as Cop
 Baldwin Cooke as Radio Man
 Harry Bowen as Vegetable Man
 Tiny Sandford as Big Cop
 Pat Harmon as Cop
 Billy Gilbert as Off-Screen Voice (uncredited)
 Carlton Griffin as Undetermined Role (uncredited)

See also
 List of American films of 1934

References

Bibliography
 Wingrove, David. Science Fiction Film Source Book (Longman Group Limited, 1985)

External links
 

1934 films
American science fiction comedy films
Metro-Goldwyn-Mayer short films
American black-and-white films
Films directed by Charley Chase
1930s science fiction comedy films
1934 short films
American comedy short films
1934 comedy films
1930s English-language films
1930s American films